Candida tolerans is an ascomycetous yeast species first isolated from Australian Hibiscus flowers. It is small and a pseudomycelium is formed. The carbon and nitrogen assimilation pattern is similar to that of Zygosaccharomyces rouxii. Its type strain is UWO (PS) 98-115.5 (CBS 8613).

References

Further reading

tolerans
Yeasts
Fungi described in 1999